is a station on the Hakone Ropeway in the town of Hakone, Kanagawa, Japan.

Lines
Ubako Station is served by the Hakone Ropeway.

Layout
The boarding area is separated for Sōunzan direction and  Tōgendai direction, with access by stairs or escalator, as the station is built barrier free for use by handicapped passengers.

History
Ubako Station opened on September 7, 1960 with the opening of the Hakone Ropeway Line.

Bus services
Izuhakone Bus  Bus Stop 
"J" line for Hakone-en (Lake Ashi) via Kojiri
"J" line for Odawara Station via Ōwakudani, Kowaki-en, Kowakidani Station, Miyanoshita, Hakone-Yumoto Station

References

External links
Hakone Ropeway
Hakone Ropeway, Transportation in Hakone (Hakone Navi)

Railway stations in Japan opened in 1960
Railway stations in Kanagawa Prefecture
Buildings and structures in Hakone, Kanagawa